Betty R. Moore (née McReavie; born 21 November 1934 in New South Wales, Australia) is an Australian athlete who ran for Great Britain.

Moore set hurdles records for New South Wales during the 1950s while completing her MSc in chemistry with Arthur Birch at the University of Sydney.  She travelled to Manchester and started training with the British athletics team, winning the British hurdles championship.

Moore was selected to represent Great Britain in the 1960 Olympic Games in Rome, but was disqualified from competing because she had resided in Britain for only 22 months instead of the required 24.  She ran for England in the 1962 British Empire and Commonwealth Games in Perth, Western Australia where she broke nine British records, one Commonwealth record and equalled the world record for the 80 metre hurdles.  She won two silver medals in the 80 metres hurdles and the 4 x 110 yard relay.

She later returned to Australia to resume her career in chemistry and retired in 1999.  Moore was an accredited coach and official and served as a technical official at the 2000 Olympic Games in Sydney where she also serves as a board member at Athletics New South Wales.

Moore's World Record qualified her for inclusion on the Athletic Centre Path of Champions at Sydney Olympic Park Athletics Centre.

CV from NSW Athletics
 Life Member Athletics Australia, Athletics NSW, Ryde Athletics Centre and Salford Harriers (UK)
 2001: Centenary Award for contribution to Youth 
 2007: Olympic Council Order of Merit 
 2004: NSW Sports Federation Award for Distinguished Service to Athletics 
 1994 to present: Athletics NSW Board member
 NSW Olympic Council member
 Member Executive Committee Girls' Brigade NSW for 16 years
 Committee Member NSW Duke of Edinburgh Award Scheme for five years
 Holds MSc, Grad. Dip. Ch. Studies, MRACI, C. Chem., Reg. Public Analyst.
 1984–1999: Former Manager of Consulting Analytical Laboratory
 2001–2003: Project Officer in Intellectual Property Management for CSIRO 
 Technical Official 2000 Olympic Games 
 NPA to Great Britain Chef de Mission 2000 Paralympic Games.
 Won two silver medals: Commonwealth Games, Perth 1962 and created a world record in the 80m Hurdles in 1962 in Germany. 
 Also multiple UK and European hurdles, 100m and relay record holder, despite being an "Aussie".
 Level 4 coach
 ANSW technical official

References
Letter from Melbourne.  Ian Rae (2005) 
CV for BETTY MOORE.
Betty Moore set a world record 47 years ago. 
SOPAC Path of Champions

External links
 Track and Field Statistics: Betty Moore (née McReavie)

1934 births
Living people
Sportswomen from New South Wales
British female hurdlers
Commonwealth Games silver medallists for England
Commonwealth Games medallists in athletics
Athletes (track and field) at the 1962 British Empire and Commonwealth Games
University of Sydney alumni
Australian expatriate sportspeople in England
Australian athletics coaches
Australian women chemists
Medallists at the 1962 British Empire and Commonwealth Games